Mandalapalli  is a village in Dammapeta mandal in Bhadradri Kothagudem district, Telangana.

Geography
Mandalapalli  has an average elevation of 206 metres (679 ft). Located on the highway 
connecting Khammam and Rajahmundry between Sathupalli and Aswaraopeta.

The village has green fields, plantations, forest, hills, hillocks, ponds, lakes, and cattle.

Economy 
Most of the people work in agriculture. Paddy, maize, sugarcane, and groundnut are the main crops. Mango, cashew nut, palm oil and coconut are major plantation crops. All these crops are irrigated either from ground water or lakes.

Villages in Khammam district

 and it is developing area recently